Academic legion may refer to:

 36th Infantry Regiment (Poland), a Polish regiment formed in the early 20th century
 Academic Legion (Vienna), a revolutionary students' group in Vienna in 1848